Haemulon squamipinna is a species of marine ray-finned fish, a grunt belonging to the family Haemulidae. It is found in the western Atlantic Ocean where it is endemic to Brazil, here it is locally known as Xira Amarela, and occurs along the coast from the states of Ceará to Bahia. It forms large schools that can number in the thousands, sometimes with Haemulon aurolineatum.

The name "squamipinna" is derived from the Latin, meaning "scaled fins", and is an allusion to the observation that the pectoral fins in this species are covered with scales, making it easy to distinguish it from other species in the genus.

References 

Fish described in 1999
Taxa named by Luiz A. Rocha
sqamipinna